John McLaurin may refer to:
 John C. McLaurin (1926–2004), American politician from Mississippi
 John L. McLaurin (1860–1934), American politician from South Carolina